Ammonium thiocyanate is an inorganic compound with the formula NH4SCN. It is the salt of the ammonium cation and the thiocyanate anion.

Uses
Ammonium thiocyanate is used in the manufacture of herbicides, thiourea, and transparent artificial resins; in matches; as a stabilizing agent in photography; in various rustproofing compositions; as an adjuvant in textile dyeing and printing; as a tracer in oil fields; in the separation of hafnium from zirconium (important for the production of hafnium-free zircalloy for use in nuclear fuel cladding), and in titrimetric analyses.

In May 1945, USAAF General Victor E. Betrandias advanced a proposal to his superior General Arnold to use of ammonium thiocyanate to reduce rice crops in Japan as part of the bombing raids on their country.

Ammonium thiocyanate can also be used to determine the iron content in soft drinks by colorimetry.

Ammonium thiocyanate may also be used to separate quinidine, from liquors, after the isolation of quinine from the neutral, aqueous, sulphate solution. The salt is added to the hot solution and the gummy solid that forms is strained off from the liquid. The solid is then refluxed with methanol, which dissolves most of the impurities, leaving the quinidine thiocyanate as a crystalline solid of 90 - 95% purity. Following separation, (usually by centrifuge) the solid may then be further purified to pharmaceutical quality. (Quinidine is used for the treatment of heart arrhythmia and therefore has considerable value.)

Preparation
Ammonium thiocyanate is made by the reaction of carbon disulfide with aqueous ammonia. Ammonium dithiocarbamate is formed as an intermediate in this reaction, which upon heating, decomposes to ammonium thiocyanate and hydrogen sulfide:

 CS2 + 2 NH3(aq) → NH2C(=S)SNH4 → NH4SCN + H2S

Reactions
Ammonium thiocyanate is stable in air; however, upon heating it isomerizes to thiourea:

The equilibrium mixtures at 150 °C and 180 °C contain 30.3% and 25.3% (by weight) thiourea, respectively. When heated at 200 °C, the dry powder decomposes to ammonia, hydrogen sulfide, and carbon disulfide, leaving a residue of guanidinium thiocyanate.

NH4SCN is weakly acidic due to the ammonium ion; it reacts with alkali hydroxides, such as sodium hydroxide or potassium hydroxide to form sodium thiocyanate or potassium thiocyanate, along with water and ammonia. The thiocyanate anion, specifically, reacts with ferric salts to form a deep-red ferric thiocyanate complex:

 6 SCN− + Fe3+ → [Fe(SCN)6]3−

Ammonium thiocyanate reacts with several metal ions including copper, silver, zinc, lead, and mercury, forming their thiocyanate precipitates, which may be extracted into organic solvents.

References

 A. F. Wells, Structural Inorganic Chemistry, 5th ed., Oxford University Press, Oxford, UK, 1984. 

Thiocyanates
Ammonium compounds
Chemical anti-agriculture weapons